The invasion of France in 1795 or the Battle of Quiberon was a major landing on the Quiberon peninsula by émigré, counter-revolutionary troops in support of the Chouannerie and Vendée Revolt, beginning on 23 June and finally definitively repulsed on 21 July. It aimed to raise the whole of western France in revolt, bring an end to the French Revolution and restore the French monarchy. The invasion failed; it had a major negative impact, dealing a disastrous blow to the royalist cause.

Army of the West (Republican) 
The Army of the West (Armée de l'Ouest) had been disbanded in late 1793 after the end of the War in the Vendée, but hastily reformed during the invasion from elements of the following; Armée du Côtes de Brest, Armée du Côtes de Normandie, and the Armée du Nord.  During the invasion, the army was led by famed Général Lazare Hoche.

Cavalry

 24éme Régiment de Cavalerie
 2éme Régiment de Dragons
 16éme Régiment de Dragons
 19éme Régiment de Dragons
 7éme Régiment de Chasseurs à Cheval
 14éme Régiment de Chasseurs à Cheval
 15éme Régiment de Chasseurs à Cheval

Infantry

 10éme Demi-Brigade de Ligne
 12éme Demi-Brigade de Ligne
 15éme Demi-Brigade de Ligne
 17éme Demi-Brigade de Ligne
 28éme Demi-Brigade de Ligne
 40éme Demi-Brigade de Ligne
 61éme Demi-Brigade de Ligne
 67éme Demi-Brigade de Ligne
 85éme Demi-Brigade de Ligne
 107éme Demi-Brigade de Ligne
 171éme Demi-Brigade de Ligne
 183éme Demi-Brigade de Ligne
 196éme Demi-Brigade de Ligne
 197éme Demi-Brigade de Ligne
 Demi-Brigade de Gers et Bayonne
 Demi-Brigade de Gironde et Lot-et-Garonne
 Demi-Brigade de Paris et Vosges
 Demi-Brigade de Deux-Sèvres

Artillery

 5éme Régiment d'Artillerie à Cheval
 1ére Compagnie d'Artillerie Volante du 5éme Régiment d'Artillerie à Pied
 Garrison Companies, 5éme Régiment d'Artillerie à Pied

Army of Charette (Royalist) 
Troops below (if applicable) include the main/secondary nationalities.  It is quickly worth noting most "regiments", didn't even reach 700 men in most cases.  Also, of the few men actually involved, the majority had been Republican prisoners and would desert en masse.

 Commander, François Athanase, Baron de Charette
 Unknown force commanded by d'Hervilly

Cavalry

 Hussards de Choieseul – French/Belgian
 Hussards de Warren

Légions (typically Cavalry & Infantry)

 Légion de Béon – French/Dutch

Infantry

 Régiment d'Émigrants Loyaux (La Châtre) – Formed the Advance-Guard during the Invasion
 Régiment du Dresnay
 Régiment d'Hervilly (2 Battalions)
 Régiment d'Hector (Marine Royale)
 Régiment de Léon
 Régiment de Damas
 Régiment de Williamson
 Infanterie Légère Salm–Kirbourg – German/French
 Infanterie Légère de Rohan – German
 Infanterie Légère de Perigord

Artillery

 Artillerie des Émigrants de Rotalier

British Armed Forces 
Though never fully involved, the below units were sent with the royalists into Brittany to provide a rear guard and support if needed.

Royal Navy

 Sir Sidney Smith's Squadron — Deployed off the coast of Normandy, making feint attacks on coastal forts as a distraction
 Sir Richard Strahan, 6th Baronet's Squadron — Deployed off the coast of Brittany
 Lord Bridgeport's Squadron — Providing close support to the transport ships

British Army

The below force was due to deploy to Brittany, but never actually arrived for many reasons, though the reason being the inability for the transport group to leave port due to foul weather.  After finally being able to set sail, the group retrieved news of the Quiberon disaster, and was withdrawn immediately.

 British Support Force: commanded by General Francis Rawdon-Hastings, Earl of Moira, 1st Marquess of Hastings
 4th (Royal Irish) Dragoon Guards
 19th (1st Yorkshire North Riding) Regiment of Foot
 40th (2nd Somersetshire) Regiment of Foot — battalion coys only,
 42nd (Royal Highland) Regiment of Foot
 1st Battalion, 78th (Highlands) Regiment of Foot (the Ross-shire Buffs)

References 

 Online: Steve Brown, Every Species of Freigner: Britain's Foreign Regiments 1793–1796.
 Louis Susane, Historie de L'Ancienne Cavalerie Français (Volumes I–III), 1874, Paris, France.
 Louis Susane, Historie de L'Ancienne Infanterie Français (Volumes II–VIII), 1850–1857, Paris, France.
 French Military, Historie des Armées Français de Terre et de Mer de 1792 à 1837 Tome II, 1838 Paris.
 Les Corps de Troupe de l’Émigration Français (Volume I–III), Paris, France
 Digby Smith, Napoleon's Regiments: Battle Histories of the Regiments of the French Army, 1792–1815, 2000 Greenhill Books, London, United Kingdom. .
 Digby Smith & Jeremy Black, An Illustrated Encyclopedia of Uniforms of the Napoleonic Wars, 2015 Lorenz Books, London, United Kingdom. .

French Revolutionary Wars orders of battle